This is a list of Utah Utes bowl games. The Utah Utes football team has played in 24 bowl games in its history, compiling a record of 17–7.

Key

Bowl games

 The Pineapple Bowl was not sanctioned by the NCAA and counts as a regular season game in official statistics

References

Utah

Utah Utes bowl games